The 2020–21 Davidson Wildcats men's basketball team represented Davidson College during the 2020–21 NCAA Division I men's basketball season. The Wildcats were led by 32nd-year head coach Bob McKillop and played their home games at the John M. Belk Arena in Davidson, North Carolina as members of the Atlantic 10 Conference. They finished the season 13–9, 7–4 in A-10 play to finish in third place. They defeated George Mason in the quarterfinals of the A-10 tournament before losing in the semifinals to VCU. They were invited to the National Invitation Tournament where they lost in the first round to NC State.

Previous season
The Wildcats finished the 2019–20 season 16–14, 10–8 in A-10 play to finish in seventh place. Their season ended when the A-10 tournament and all other postseason tournaments were canceled due to the ongoing coronavirus pandemic.

Offseason

Departures

2020 recruiting class

Source

2021 recruiting class

Source

Roster

Schedule and results 

|-
!colspan=12 style=| Regular season
|-

|-
!colspan=12 style=| A-10 tournament

|-
!colspan=12 style=| NIT

Source

References

Davidson
Davidson Wildcats men's basketball seasons
Davidson Wildcats men's basketball
Davidson Wildcats men's basketball
Davidson